Vladislav Pavlovich Poletayev (born 5 January 2000) is a Russian football goalkeeper who plays for FC Forte Taganrog on loan from FC Ural Yekaterinburg.

Club career
He made his debut in the Russian Premier League for FC Ural Yekaterinburg on 12 July 2020 in a game against FC Krasnodar, as a starter.

On 28 December 2021, he moved on loan to FC Tom Tomsk. On 20 June 2022, Poletayev was loaned to FC Volga Ulyanovsk.

References

External links
 
 
 

2000 births
Sportspeople from Yekaterinburg
Living people
Russian footballers
Russia youth international footballers
Association football goalkeepers
FC Ural Yekaterinburg players
FC Irtysh Omsk players
FC Orenburg players
FC Tom Tomsk players
FC Volga Ulyanovsk players
Russian Premier League players
Russian First League players
Russian Second League players